Statistics of Latvian Higher League in the 1965 season.

Overview
It was contested by 14 teams, and ASK won the championship.

League standings

References
 RSSSF

Latvian SSR Higher League
Football 
Latvia